The Blue Gables Motel, formerly known as Blue Gables Court, in Buffalo, Wyoming is a motel that was placed on the National Register of Historic Places in 2011 as part of a Multiple Property Submission devoted to historic motor courts and motels in Wyoming.

Most of the motel's guest accommodation consists of 17 small log cabins. The motel includes an area for tent camping and a two-bedroom house available for rental. It began operation in 1939.

See also
 List of motels

References

External links
Blue Gables Motel, official site

Hotel buildings on the National Register of Historic Places in Wyoming
Buildings and structures in Buffalo, Wyoming
Motels in the United States
National Register of Historic Places in Johnson County, Wyoming